There Are Two Kinds of Music... Rock 'n' Roll is an album by Welsh rock and roll singer Shakin' Stevens, released in October 1990. It was released by Telstar Records in the UK and by Epic Records in Europe. It peaked at number 65 on the UK Albums Chart.

Release and content 
In an attempt to modernise his music, Stevens recorded the album with producer Pete Hammond, known for his work with Stock Aitken Waterman. There were five singles released from the album. The first two, "Love Attack" and "I Might" were UK Top-30 hits; however the final three did not chart so highly, with "Pink Champagne" charting the highest at number 59. Unlike Stevens' previous albums, this album only includes a few cover songs: "Tear It Up", originally by Johnny Burnette, "If I Lose You", originally by Billy Fury, and "Queen of the Hop", originally by Bobby Darin.

On the original album release, all the tracks are credited to being produced by Hammond. However, on the 2009 release of the album as part of The Epic Masters box set, this is revealed to not be the case. "Love Attack" (produced by Stevens and Carey Taylor) and "Rockin' the Night Away" (no producer given) were not produced by Hammond, but he did remix both of them for the album. The box set includes several bonus tracks: the single version of "Love Attack", three B-sides and the single "Radio". "Radio" was released in September 1992 to promote The Epic Years and was Stevens' last official single released by Epic. The single, produced by Rod Argent and Peter Van Hooke, features Queen member Roger Taylor on drums as well as Argent on keyboards.

Track listing 

2009 bonus tracks:

Personnel 
Technical

 Gordon Dennis – engineer
 The Artifex Studio – design, artwork
 Eugene Adebari – photography
 Shakin' Stevens – compiling

References 

1990 albums
Shakin' Stevens albums
Telstar Records albums
Epic Records albums